The second annual Altazor Awards took place on March 26, 2001, at the Teatro Municipal de Santiago.

Nominations

Literary Arts

Narrative 
 Alejandra Costamagna  – Las malas noches
 Adolfo Couve  – Cuando pienso en mi falta de cabeza
 Hernán Rivera Letelier  – Los trenes se van al purgatorio
 Mauricio Wacquez  – Epifanía de una sombra

Poetry 
 Delia Domínguez  – Huevos revueltos
 Mauricio Redolés  – Estar de la poesía o el estilo de las matemáticas
 Gonzalo Rojas  – Que se ama cuando se ama
 Armando Uribe  – Contra la voluntad

Essay 
 Diamela Eltit  – Emergencias, escritos sobre Literatura, Arte y Política
 Felipe Portales  – Chile: una democracia tutelada
 Volodia Teitelboim  – La gran guerra de Chile y otra que nunca existió
 Raúl Zurita  – Sobre el amor, el sufrimiento y el nuevo milenio

Visual Arts

Painting 
 Gracia Barrios  – Gracia Barrios. Pinturas 1985-2000
 Patricia Israel  – El gran silencio
 Gustavo Pobrete  – Integración plástica
 Eugenio Téllez  – Campos de batalla

Sculpture 
 Francisco Gacitúa  – Buques de acero
 Norma Ramírez  – Carne
 Marcela Romagnoli  – Maderas y maderas
 Rosa Vicuña  – Períodos

Engraving and Drawing 
 Francisco Copello  – Chilean Engraving of the Mercosur
 Natasha Pons  – Muestra colectiva Asociación de Pintores y Escultores de Chile 
 Lotty Rosenfeld  – Chilean Engraving of the Mercosur

Installation art and Video art 
 Carlos Altamirano  – XII Muestra  del Museo de Arte Moderno de Chiloé
 Pamela Caviares  – Plegado artificial
 Pablo Langlois  – Día
 Sebastián Perece  – Plegado artificial

Photography 
 Jorge Brantmayer  – La vida está en otra parte
 Alvaro Hoppe  – El artificio del lente. Apuntes de viaje 98/00
 Alvaro Larco  – Díptico
 Juan Meza-Lopehandía  – Cuasimodo, correr al Cristo

Performing Arts Theatre

Dramaturgy 
 Compañía Teatro Aparte  – Yo, tú y ... ellos
 Marco Antonio de la Parra  – La vida privada
 Jorge Díaz  – Mirada obscura
 Egon Wolff  – Encrucijada

Director 
 Martín Erazo  – Húsar de la muerte
 Ramón Griffero  – Cinema Utoppia
 Gustavo Meza  – Fatamorgana de amor para banda del litro
 Jaime Vadell  – Yo, tú y ...ellos

Actor 
 Daniel Alcaíno  – Ultimo gol gana
 Rodolfo Bravo  – Muerte accidental de un anarquista
 Max Corvalán  – Claro de Luna
 Fernando Gallardo  – Sinvergüenzas
 Pablo Schwarz  – Cinema Utoppia

Actress 
 Verónica García-Huidobro  – Cinema Utoppia
 Maité Fernández  – Santas, vírgenes y mártires
 Tichi Lobos  – Venecia
 Amparo Noguera  – El Coordinador

Performing Arts Dance

Choreography 
 Teresa Alcaíno  – Mistral 
 Beatriz Alcalde  – Cha Cha...! 
 Nury Gutes  – Seno Skyiring 
 Elizabeth Rodríguez  – Sin respiro

Male Dancer 
 Jorge Carreño  – Oskolki (Espejos quebrados) 
 Andrés Maulen  – Mistral
 César Morales  – Coppelia
 Luis Ortigoza  – Manon

Female Dancer 
 Natalia Berríos  – Manon
 Marcela Goicochea  – Manon
 Vivian Romo  – Rapsodia
 Francisca Sazié  – Sin respiro

Musical Arts

Classical music 
 Fernando García  – Rosa perfumada entre los astros
 Guillermo Rifo  – Director of the Sinfónica Juvenil 'Estrenos de obras chilenas'
 Cirilo Vila  – In Memoriam B.Bartok
 Miguel Angel Villafruela  – Compositores 1988-1998

Traditional music 
 Chilhué  – Hechicerías
 Tito Fernández  – 40 años del canto popular
 Inti-Illimani  – Interpreta a Víctor Jara
 Manuel Sánchez  – Manuel Sánchez

Ballad 
 La Sociedad  – Bar de amores
 Alberto Plaza  – 15 años en vivo
 Fernando Ubiergo  – Los ojos del mar
 Alvaro Véliz  – Alvaro Véliz

Pop/Rock 
 Chancho en Piedra  – Marca chancho
 Gondwana  – Alabanza por la fuerza de la razón
 Supernova  – Supernova

Alternative/Jazz 
 Francesca Ancarola  – Pasaje de ida y vuelta
 La Marraqueta  – Sayhueque
 Antonio Restucci  – Cenizas en el mar
 Vernáculo  – Viva la chinita de Andacollo

Playing 
 Marcelo Aedo (Bass)
 Christian Cuturrufo (Trumpet) 
 Antonio Restucci (Acoustic guitar)

Media Arts Film

Director 
 Ignacio Agüero  – Aquí se construye
 Juan Carlos Bustamante  – El vecino
 Silvio Caiozzi  – Coronación
 Jorge Olguín  – Angel negro
 Martín Rodríguez  – En un lugar de la noche

Actor 
 Luciano Cruz-Coke  – En un lugar de la noche
 Julio Jung  – Coronación
 José Soza  – El vecino
 Jaime Vadell  – Coronación

Actress 
 María Cánepa  – Coronación
 Gabriela Medina  – Coronación
 Myriam Palacios  – Coronación
 Adela Secal  – Coronación

Creative Contribution 
 Luis Advis (Music of Coronación)
 Guadalupe Bornand (Art Director of Coronación)
 Juan Carlos Bustamante, Bernardita Valenzuela and Danielle Fillios (Editing of El vecino)
 Sophie França (Editing of Aquí se construye)

Media Arts TV

Director 
 Paola Castillo  – El Show de los libros
 Mercedes Ducci and Patricio Hernández  – Contacto
 Cristián Leighton  – Patiperros
 Vicente Sabatini  – Romané

Screenplay 
 Fernando Aragón, Hugo Morales, Arnaldo Madrid and Nona Fernández  – Aquelarre
 Sebastián Arrau and Coca Gómez  – Cerro Alegre
 Pablo Illanes  – Fuera de Control
 Vicente Sabatini  – Romané

Actor 
 Néstor Cantillana  – Romané
 Alfredo Castro  – Romané
 Héctor Noguera  – Romané
 Mauricio Pesutic  – Santoladrón

Actress 
 Claudia Di Girólamo  – Romané
 Francisca Imboden  – Romané
 Solange Lackington  – Sabor a ti
 Paulina Urrutia  – Sabor a ti

Creative Contribution 
 Mercedes Ducci and Patricia Undurraga (Journalistic research of the Reportajes del siglo)
 Alejandro Guillier (Host of Tolerancia Cero)
 Matías Lira (Original Format of Ocio TV)
 Gabriela Tesmer and Ricardo Astorga (Production and investigative journalism of the El Mirador)

References

Chilean awards